The 1961–62 season was Colchester United's 20th season in their history and their first-ever season in the fourth tier of English football, the Fourth Division. Alongside competing in the Fourth Division, the club also participated in the FA Cup and the League Cup.

Colchester bounced back to the Third Division at the first time of asking, earning their first promotion in the club's history by finishing as runners–up. By the end of the campaign, Colchester trailed Millwall by just one point, winning 23 games and scoring 104 league goals with Bobby Hunt the division's top scorer. The club experienced their record victory during the season when they beat Bradford City 9–1 on 30 December.

In the cup competitions, first-round exits were experienced in both FA and League cups. Colchester were beaten at home to Crewe Alexandra in September in the League Cup, while it took Peterborough United three attempts to overcome Colchester in the FA Cup first round following a second replay.

Season overview
At the end of a very disappointing 1960–61 season, manager Benny Fenton cut his playing squad by ten players, with players including Neil Langman, Chic Milligan and Tommy Williams all released. The club was over £3,300 in debt, and so a fresh start required for the new season with a new, slimline squad. Just 17 players would be used in the new campaign, with eight of those playing over 40 of the 44 league games possible.

The season started well for Colchester, unbeaten in their first nine league games and scoring 31 goals in the first eight home games to top the Fourth Division table.

During Colchester's heaviest defeat of the season, a 5–0 reverse at York City, the 20-month old son of full back Tommy Millar drowned in a garden pond accident while Millar was playing in the game. This tragedy would also spell the end of Millar's Colchester career when he left to return to Scotland in early 1962. This coincided with a poor run of form and the club slipped to third in the table.

On the back of a 4–1 Boxing Day defeat to Bradford City, Colchester set their record club victory in the return fixture at Layer Road on 30 December. Both Bobby Hunt and strike–partner Martyn King scored four goals each, with Bobby Hill scoring the other as Colchester ran out 9–1 winners. A 4–0 victory at Accrington Stanley saw United regain the top spot from Wrexham, but just a few weeks later, Accrington folded and Colchester's 3–2 and 4–0 wins were expunged.

Defeats to Millwall and Wrexham cost Colchester the championship. Millwall took the title by one point as United finished runners-up with eleven away defeats proving costly. Of the record 104 goals scored in the league during the season, 78 came at home, while Martyn King broke his seasonal record by scoring 31 league goals only to be surpassed by Bobby Hunt with 38, a new club record. Hunt scored three hat-tricks on his way to his tally of 38 with two of those four goal hauls.

Players

Transfers

In

Out

Match details

Fourth Division

Results round by round

League table

Matches

League Cup

FA Cup

Squad statistics

Appearances and goals

|-
!colspan="14"|Players who appeared for Colchester who left during the season

|}

Goalscorers

Disciplinary record

Clean sheets
Number of games goalkeepers kept a clean sheet.

Player debuts
Players making their first-team Colchester United debut in a fully competitive match.

See also
List of Colchester United F.C. seasons

References

General
Books

Websites

Specific

1961-62
English football clubs 1961–62 season